= Monopamba =

- Location in Nariño and Colombia Monopamba (Colombia)
- Coordinates: 0°48′20.9448″N 77°18′17.874″W
- Country: Colombia
- Department: Nariño
- Municipality: Puerres municipality
- Elevation: 5,827 ft (1,776 m)

Population (2005)
  - Total: 440
- Time zone: UTC-5 (Colombia Standard Time)

Monopamba is a settlement in Puerres Municipality, Nariño Department in Colombia.

== Climate ==
At about 1,700 metres or 5,600 feet above sea level, Monopamba has a warm, very wet and very cloudy subtropical highland climate (Köppen Cfb).

Climate data for Monopamba
Month	Jan	Feb	Mar	Apr	May	Jun	Jul	Aug	Sep	Oct	Nov	Dec	Year
Mean daily maximum °C (°F)	20.9 (69.6)	20.9 (69.6)	21.3 (70.3)	21.1 (70.0)	20.7 (69.3)	19.3 (66.7)	18.8 (65.8)	19.7 (67.5)	21.1 (70.0)	21.8 (71.2)	21.9 (71.4)	21.6 (70.9)	20.8 (69.4)
Daily mean °C (°F)	16.9 (62.4)	17.0 (62.6)	17.1 (62.8)	17.1 (62.8)	16.8 (62.2)	16.1 (61.0)	15.6 (60.1)	15.9 (60.6)	16.5 (61.7)	17.1 (62.8)	17.3 (63.1)	17.2 (63.0)	16.7 (62.1)
Mean daily minimum °C (°F)	13.5 (56.3)	13.7 (56.7)	13.7 (56.7)	13.9 (57.0)	14.1 (57.4)	13.7 (56.7)	12.9 (55.2)	12.9 (55.2)	13.0 (55.4)	13.3 (55.9)	13.6 (56.5)	13.7 (56.7)	13.5 (56.3)
Average rainfall mm (inches)	200.9 (7.91)	189.0 (7.44)	199.6 (7.86)	269.5 (10.61)	342.6 (13.49)	417.6 (16.44)	428.0 (16.85)	363.1 (14.30)	245.5 (9.67)	179.1 (7.05)	153.9 (6.06)	192.6 (7.58)	3,181.4 (125.26)
Average rainy days	24	22	25	27	28	27	28	27	25	25	23	24	305
Average relative humidity (%)	90	89	89	90	90	91	91	91	89	88	88	89	90
Mean monthly sunshine hours	83.7	59.3	49.6	51.0	52.7	39.0	40.3	46.5	60.0	80.6	96.0	89.9	748.6
Mean daily sunshine hours	2.7	2.1	1.6	1.7	1.7	1.3	1.3	1.5	2.0	2.6	3.2	2.9	2.1
